Raghava Gogineni, better known as Maharshi Raghava, is an Indian actor who works in Telugu films and television. Raghava acted in more than 170 films in various roles. He shot into fame as a lead actor with his first film Maharshi (1987), which gave him the moniker Maharshi. He is a recipient of two Nandi TV Awards.

Personal life
He studied till tenth standard in Tenali Thaluk High school. He also has stage experience. He played Mahatma Gandhi in a play called Gandhi Jayanthi. He visited U.S.A multiple times along with Murali Mohan, Nandamuri Balakrishna, and Paruchuri Brothers.

Filmography

Awards
Nandi TV Awards
 1997: Best Villan for Naari Yaagam
 1999: Special Jury Award – Actor for Puvvu

References

External links
 

Living people
Telugu male actors
Male actors from Andhra Pradesh
Indian male film actors
People from Tenali
Male actors in Telugu cinema
20th-century Indian male actors
21st-century Indian male actors
Year of birth missing (living people)